The London, Kentucky micropolitan area is made up of three counties in the Eastern Coalfield region of Kentucky. Before 2013, the area was officially known as the Corbin-London, KY Combined Statistical Area, and consisted of the Corbin Micropolitan Statistical Area and the London Micropolitan Statistical Area. The Corbin micropolitan area consisted of Whitley County, and the London micropolitan area consisted of Laurel County.

In 2013, the United States Census Bureau folded the CSA into the redefined London micropolitan area, and Knox County was added to the statistical area. This incidentally ended a statistical anomaly that excluded the 20% of the population of Corbin living in Knox County from the statistical area.

As of the 2010 United States Census, the region now defined as the London micropolitan area had a population of 126,369.

As of the census of 2000, the statistical area, which then consisted of only Laurel and Whitley Counties, had a population of 88,580 and had an estimated population of 96,562 in 2009.

Counties
Knox
Laurel
Whitley

Communities

Incorporated places
Barbourville (Knox)
Corbin (Whitley, Laurel, and Knox)
London (Laurel)
Williamsburg (Whitley)

Census-designated places
Note: All census-designated places are unincorporated.

Knox County
Artemus
Flat Lick
North Corbin (part)

Laurel County
East Bernstadt
North Corbin (part)

Whitley County
Emlyn
Pleasant View
Rockholds

Unincorporated places

Knox County
Bimble
Bryants Store
Cannon
Crane Nest
Dewitt
Girdler
Green Road
Heidrick
Himyar
Hinkle
Kayjay
Mills
Powers Coal Camp
Salt Gum
Scalf
The Forks of Stinking
Trosper
Walker
Warren
Watch
Woollum

Laurel County
Atlanta
Bernstadt
Boreing
Buch
Bush
Cruise
Hopewell
Keavy
Lake
Lily
Pittsburg
Sublimity City
Symbol

Whitley County
 Carpenter
 Dixie
 Gatliff
 Goldbug
 Julip
 Lot
 Louden Coal Camp
 Lucky
 Mountain Ash
 Nevisdale
 Rain
 Red Ash Coal Camp
 Redbird
 Saxton
 Scuffletown
 Watts Creek Jellico Coal Company
 Wofford
 Woodbine
 Yaden

Demographics
As of the census of 2000, there were 88,580 people, 34,163 households, and 25,414 families residing within the CSA. The racial makeup of the CSA was 97.66% White, 0.6% African American, 0.2% Native American, 0.3% Asian, 0.002% Pacific Islander, 0.2% from other races, and 1.0% from two or more races. Hispanics or Latinos of any race were 1.1% of the population.

The median income for a household in the CSA was $25,254, and the median income for a family was $30,193. Males had a median income of $21,507 versus $15,031 for females. The per capita income for the CSA was $13,603.

See also
Kentucky census statistical areas
List of cities in Kentucky

References

Laurel County, Kentucky
Whitley County, Kentucky
Knox County, Kentucky